The Catholic Church in Mali is part of the worldwide Catholic Church (particularly the Latin Church), under the spiritual leadership of the Pope in Rome.

There are just under 200,000 Catholics in Mali, around 1.5% of the total population.

Dioceses
 Archdiocese of Bamako
 Diocese of Kayes
 Diocese of Mopti
 Diocese of San
 Diocese of Ségou
 Diocese of Sikasso

References

 
Mali